The Eurasian Business Review: A Journal in Industrial Organization, Innovation and Management Science is a quarterly peer-reviewed academic journal covering all aspects of business administration related to the Eurasian region. It was established in 2011 and, along with the Eurasian Economic Review, is an official journal of the Eurasia Business and Economics Society. The society publishes it in association with Springer Nature and the editor-in-chief is Marco Vivarelli.

Abstracting and indexing
The journal is abstracted and indexed in:
Current Contents/Social And Behavioral Sciences
EBSCO databases
EconLit
International Bibliography of Periodical Literature
International Bibliography of the Social Sciences
ProQuest databases)
Social Sciences Citation Index
Scopus

References

External links

Eurasia Business and Economics Society

Publications established in 2011
Business and management journals
Springer Science+Business Media academic journals
Quarterly journals
English-language journals
Hybrid open access journals